June 19 - Eastern Orthodox Church calendar - June 21

All fixed commemorations below celebrated on July 3 by Orthodox Churches on the Old Calendar.

For June 20th, Orthodox Churches on the Old Calendar commemorate the Saints listed on June 7.

Saints
 Martyrs Paul, Cyriacus, Paula, Felicilana, Thomas, Felix, Martyrius, Vitaly, Crispinus, and Emilius, in Tomis, Moesia (290)
 Hieromartyrs Aristocleus, priest, the deacon Demetrian, and the reader Athanasius, at Salamis on Cyprus (c. 306)  (see also: June 23)
 Hieromartyr Methodius of Olympus in Lycia, Bishop of Patara (312)
 Blessed Studius, founder of the Studion Monastery (5th century)
 Venerable Nahum of Ochrid, Enlightener of the Bulgarians (910)
 The Venerable Two Ascetic Hermits, reposed in peace in the desert.

Pre-Schism Western saints
 Saint Novatus, son of Pudens, senator of Rome, and brother of Sts Praxedes and Pudentiana (c. 151)
 Saint Alban, Protomartyr of Britain (c. 303)  (see also: June 22 )
 Saint Leucius the Confessor, Bishop of Brindisi (Brentisiopolis) (5th century)
 Hieromartyr Silverius, Pope of Rome (537)
 Saint Govan (Goven, Cofen), hermit who lived in a fissure on the side of coastal cliff near Bosherston, in the Pembrokeshire Coast National Park, Wales (586)
 Saint Florentina (Florence), Abbess, of Spain (c. 636) 
 Saint Goban (Gobain), an Irish Benedictine monk and spiritual student of Saint Fursey at Burgh Castle, Norfolk, England (670)
 Saint Bain (Bainus, Bagnus), a monk at Fontenelle in France, he became Bishop of Thérouanne (c. 710)
 Saint Helen (Heliada), Abbess of the convent of Oehren in Trier in Germany (c. 750)
 Saint Adalbert of Magdeburg, Abbot of Weissenburg, and in 968 the first Archbishop of Magdeburg, with jurisdiction over the western Slavs or Sorbs (981)

Post-Schism Orthodox saints
 Saint Minas, Bishop of Polotsk (1116)
 Right-believing Prince Gleb Andreyevich of Vladimir (1175)
 Venerable Callistus I, Patriarch of Constantinople (1363)
 Venerable Nicholas Kabasilas, Byzantine mystic and theological writer, spiritual child of St. Gregory Sinaitis (1392 or 1397)
 Venerable new monk-martyr Zacharias of Arta, Greece (1782)

New martyrs and confessors
 New Hieromartyr Stanislav Nasadil, victim of the Nazi Croatia concentration camp at Gospić (1941)

Other commemorations
 Translation of the relics (1st-2nd century) of Martyrs Inna, Pinna, and Rimma, Scythian disciples of Apostle Andrew, to Alushta in Crimea (1st-2nd century)(see also: January 20 )
 Translation of the relics and garments (c. 960) of Apostles Luke, Andrew, and Thomas, Prophet Elisha, and Martyr Lazarus to the Church of the Holy Apostles in Constantinople.
 Uncovering of the relics (1001) of Edward the Martyr, King of England (978)  <small>(see also: March 18 - feast, and February 13 - translation)</small>
 Translation of the relics of St. Gurias, Archbishop of Kazan (1630)Translation of the relics of St Gurias the Archbishop of Kazan. OCA - Lives of the Saints.
 Finding of the relics (1959) of New Hieromartyr Raphael, Hieromonk, of Mytilene (1463)  (see also: April 9 )
 Icon of the Most Holy Theotokos "Odigitria" ("Directress"), at the Xenophontos monastery on Mt Athos.Icon of the Mother of God “the Directress” from the Monastery of Xenophontos on Mt Athos. OCA - Lives of the Saints.
 Icon of the Most Holy Theotokos "Modensk-Kosninsk".Great Synaxaristes:  Σύναξις Ὑπεραγίας Θεοτόκου τῆς «Μοντένᾳ» ἐν Ρωσία. 20 ΙΟΥΝΙΟΥ. ΜΕΓΑΣ ΣΥΝΑΞΑΡΙΣΤΗΣ.

Icon gallery

Notes

References

Sources
 June 20/July 3. Orthodox Calendar (PRAVOSLAVIE.RU).
 July 3 / June 20. HOLY TRINITY RUSSIAN ORTHODOX CHURCH (A parish of the Patriarchate of Moscow).
 June 20. OCA - The Lives of the Saints.
 The Autonomous Orthodox Metropolia of Western Europe and the Americas (ROCOR). St. Hilarion Calendar of Saints for the year of our Lord 2004. St. Hilarion Press (Austin, TX). p. 45.
 The Twentieth Day of the Month of June. Orthodoxy in China.
 June 20. Latin Saints of the Orthodox Patriarchate of Rome.
 The Roman Martyrology. Transl. by the Archbishop of Baltimore. Last Edition, According to the Copy Printed at Rome in 1914. Revised Edition, with the Imprimatur of His Eminence Cardinal Gibbons. Baltimore: John Murphy Company, 1916. pp. 179–180.
 Rev. Richard Stanton. A Menology of England and Wales, or, Brief Memorials of the Ancient British and English Saints Arranged According to the Calendar, Together with the Martyrs of the 16th and 17th Centuries. London: Burns & Oates, 1892. pp. 276–278.
Greek Sources
 Great Synaxaristes:  20 ΙΟΥΝΙΟΥ. ΜΕΓΑΣ ΣΥΝΑΞΑΡΙΣΤΗΣ.
  Συναξαριστής. 20 Ιουνίου. ECCLESIA.GR. (H ΕΚΚΛΗΣΙΑ ΤΗΣ ΕΛΛΑΔΟΣ). 
  20 Ιουνίου. Αποστολική Διακονία της Εκκλησίας της Ελλάδος (Apostoliki Diakonia of the Church of Greece).
  20/06/2018.'' Ορθόδοξος Συναξαριστής. 
Russian Sources
  3 июля (20 июня). Православная Энциклопедия под редакцией Патриарха Московского и всея Руси Кирилла (электронная версия). (Orthodox Encyclopedia - Pravenc.ru).
  20 июня по старому стилю / 3 июля по новому стилю. Русская Православная Церковь - Православный церковный календарь на 2017 год.
  20 июня (ст.ст.) 3 июля 2014 (нов. ст.). Русская Православная Церковь Отдел внешних церковных связей. (DECR).

June in the Eastern Orthodox calendar